Ezekiel 17 is the seventeenth chapter of the Book of Ezekiel in the Hebrew Bible or the Old Testament of the Christian Bible. This book contains the prophecies attributed to the prophet/priest Ezekiel, and is one of the Books of the Prophets. This chapter tells (verses 1–10), and then interprets (verses 11–21), the riddle of the great eagle.

Text
The original text of this chapter is written in the Hebrew language. This chapter is divided into 24 verses.

The Riddle to the House of Israel 
The ḥidah or the Riddle to the House of Israel, is the oracle revealed to Ezekiel the prophet. It is a mashal or a parable. It is also considered a proverb. The riddle is 8 verses long from verse 3 to verse 10.

Hebrew Bible version
Following is the Hebrew text of Ezekiel 17:1-10:

King James Version
 And the word of the LORD came unto me, saying,
 Son of man, put forth a riddle, and speak a parable unto the house of Israel;
 And say, Thus saith the Lord GOD; A great eagle with great wings, longwinged, full of feathers, which had divers colours, came unto Lebanon, and took the highest branch of the cedar:
 He cropped off the top of his young twigs, and carried it into a land of traffick; he set it in a city of merchants.
 He took also of the seed of the land, and planted it in a fruitful field; he placed it by great waters, and set it as a willow tree.
 And it grew, and became a spreading vine of low stature, whose branches turned toward him, and the roots thereof were under him: so it became a vine, and brought forth branches, and shot forth sprigs.
 There was also another great eagle with great wings and many feathers: and, behold, this vine did bend her roots toward him, and shot forth her branches toward him, that he might water it by the furrows of her plantation.
 It was planted in a good soil by great waters, that it might bring forth branches, and that it might bear fruit, that it might be a goodly vine.
 Say thou, Thus saith the Lord GOD; Shall it prosper? shall he not pull up the roots thereof, and cut off the fruit thereof, that it wither? it shall wither in all the leaves of her spring, even without great power or many people to pluck it up by the roots thereof.
 Yea, behold, being planted, shall it prosper? shall it not utterly wither, when the east wind toucheth it? it shall wither in the furrows where it grew.

Textual witnesses
Some early manuscripts containing the text of this chapter in Hebrew are of the Masoretic Text tradition, which includes the Codex Cairensis (895), the Petersburg Codex of the Prophets (916), Aleppo Codex (10th century), Codex Leningradensis (1008).

There is also a translation into Koine Greek known as the Septuagint, made in the last few centuries BC. Extant ancient manuscripts of the Septuagint version include Codex Vaticanus (B; B; 4th century), Codex Alexandrinus (A; A; 5th century) and Codex Marchalianus (Q; Q; 6th century).

Parable of two eagles and a vine (17:1–21)

Verse 2
 Son of man, put forth a riddle,
 and speak a parable unto the house of Israel.

"Son of man" (Hebrew:  ben-adam): this phrase is used 93 times to address Ezekiel.
"Riddle" (Hebrew:  hidah): the Hebrew word has a meaning of "dark, obscure utterance", requiring interpretation; the passage is also called a "parable", as containing a similitude (Hebrew:  mashal) or comparison.

Verse 3
and say, ‘Thus says the Lord God:
"A great eagle with large wings and long pinions,
Full of feathers of various colors,
Came to Lebanon
And took from the cedar the highest branch."
"A great eagle": refers to Nebuchadnezzar, king of Babylon. Conquerors are also compared to an eagle in:
Deuteronomy 28:49;
Isaiah 46:11;
Jeremiah 4:13;
Jeremiah 48:40;
Hosea 8:1;
Lamentations 4:19.

Verse 9
 "Say, 'Thus says the Lord God:
 "Will it thrive?
 Will he not pull up its roots,
 Cut off its fruit,
 And leave it to wither?
 All of its spring leaves will wither,
 And no great power or many people
 Will be needed to pluck it up by its roots."'"
 Rashi noted that the entire Hebrew alphabet is found in this verse.

Verse 15
But he rebelled against him in sending his ambassadors into Egypt, that they might give him horses and much people. Shall he prosper? Shall he escape who does such things? Can he indeed break the covenant and be delivered?
"Against him": here, "against the King of Babylon"
"Into Egypt": that is, asking help from the king of Egypt at that time, Pharaoh Hophra (Apries) (Jeremiah 37:5; Jeremiah 44:30).
"Break the covenant": Zedekiah broke the covenant not only of the king of Babylon but also  of YHWH (Ezekiel 17:19); Ezekiel follows the prophecy of Jeremiah, perhaps he heard Jeremiah spoke in the beginning of Zedekiah's reign (Jeremiah 27:9-17: "serve the king of Babylon and live") or even probably he had heard Jeremiah's words spoken in the fourth year of Jehoiakim (Ezekiel 25) or Jeremiah's advice to the exiles (cf. Jeremiah 29:4).

Verse 16
As I live, saith the Lord God, surely in the place where the king dwelleth that made him king, whose oath he despised, and whose covenant he brake, even with him in the midst of Babylon he shall die.
 The prophecy was fulfilled when Zedekiah died in the prison in Babylon (Jeremiah 39:7; Jeremiah 52:11).

Israel exalted at last (17:22–24)

Verse 23
 On the mountain height of Israel I will plant it;
 and it will bring forth boughs, and bear fruit, and be a majestic cedar.
 Under it will dwell birds of every sort;
 in the shadow of its branches they will dwell.
This "messianic allegory" is presented with the reference to the "branch" in Isaiah 11:1; ; Zechariah 3:8, which grows to be "a majestic cedar."

As shown in the Daily Mass Readings provided in the Latin Rite of the Roman Catholic Church, one of the main references in the Gospels is the Parable of the Mustard Seed.

See also

Related Bible parts: 2 Kings 24, 2 Chronicles 36, Isaiah 11, Jeremiah 37, Jeremiah 52, Ezekiel 29, Ezekiel 30, Matthew 13

Notes

References

Bibliography

External links

Jewish
Ezekiel 17 Hebrew with Parallel English
Ezekiel 17 Hebrew with Rashi's Commentary

Christian
Ezekiel 17 English Translation with Parallel Latin Vulgate

17